Ryan Thomas Cordell (born March 31, 1992) is an American professional baseball outfielder who is a free agent. He previously played in Major League Baseball (MLB) for the Chicago White Sox and New York Mets.

Career
Cordell attended Valley Christian Academy in Roseville, California, graduating in 2010. He attended Liberty University and played college baseball for the Liberty Flames.

Texas Rangers
The Texas Rangers selected Cordell in the 11th round of the 2013 MLB draft. He began playing in the Rangers' organization in 2013, posting a .248 batting average with the Spokane Indians.

In 2014, Cordell started the baseball season with the Hickory Crawdads of the Class A South Atlantic League and was later promoted to the Myrtle Beach Pelicans of the Class A-Advanced Carolina League in late August of that year. In 89 games between the two teams he batted .318 with 13 home runs and 59 RBIs. Prior to the 2015 season, he was converted from an outfielder to shortstop. He started the 2015 season with the High Desert Mavericks of the Class A-Advanced California League and was moved mid-season to finish with the Frisco RoughRiders of the Class AA Texas League, transferring back to outfield and utility player status. In 124 games, he slashed .270/.327/.444 with 18 home runs and 75 RBIs. After the 2015 season, Cordell was brought up as a reserve batter for the Round Rock Express of the Class AAA Pacific Coast League (PCL) in their championship series in September 2015.

In 2016, Cordell began the season with Frisco, where he posted two grand slams in the first 13 games of the season, to join Bryce Harper of the Washington Nationals as one of only two players in professional baseball to net two grand slams in the first three weeks of the 2016 season, a feat which garnered him Texas League Player of the Month for April 2016.

Milwaukee Brewers
The Milwaukee Brewers acquired Cordell on September 5, 2016, as the player to be named later from the August 1 trade for Jonathan Lucroy and Jeremy Jeffress. Cordell finished 2016 with a .264 batting average with 19 home runs and 70 RBIs. The Brewers added him to their 40-man roster after the season. He began the 2017 season with the Colorado Springs Sky Sox of the PCL, batting .284 with ten home runs and 45 RBIs in 68 games.

Chicago White Sox
On July 25, 2017, Cordell was traded by the Brewers to the Chicago White Sox for pitcher Anthony Swarzak. He did not play the rest of the season after being acquired by Chicago due to injury.

Cordell began 2018 with the Charlotte Knights of the Class AAA International League. The White Sox promoted Cordell to the major leagues on September 3, 2018, and he made his major league debut that day as a pinch runner. On October 28, 2019, the White Sox outrighted Cordell off of the roster. He became a free agent following the 2019 season.

New York Mets
On January 3, 2020, Cordell signed a minor league deal with the New York Mets. Cordell had his contract selected to the 40-man roster on July 29, 2020. Cordell was designated for assignment on August 5. On September 26, Cordell was selected back to the active roster. On October 26, Cordell was designated for assignment by the Mets following the acquisition of Robel García. He elected free agency on October 28.

Philadelphia Phillies
On April 26, 2021, Cordell signed a minor league contract with the Philadelphia Phillies organization. Cordell played in 57 games for the Triple-A Lehigh Valley IronPigs, slashing .198/.292/.411 with 12 home runs and 28 RBI. On July 22, Cordell was released by the Phillies.

Gastonia Honey Hunters
On August 10, 2021, Cordell signed with the Gastonia Honey Hunters of the Atlantic League of Professional Baseball. He became a free agent following the season. In 39 games he slashed .231/.359/.471 with 7 home runs and 23 RBIs.

References

External links

Living people
1992 births
Baseball players from Sacramento, California
Major League Baseball outfielders
Chicago White Sox players
New York Mets players
Liberty Flames baseball players
Spokane Indians players
Hickory Crawdads players
Myrtle Beach Pelicans players
High Desert Mavericks players
Frisco RoughRiders players
Round Rock Express players
Colorado Springs Sky Sox players
Charlotte Knights players
Lehigh Valley IronPigs players
Gastonia Honey Hunters players